Mahtab Servati (Persian: مهتاب ثروتی‎; born January 22, 1992) is an Iranian actress and photographer. She is best known for her performance in There Is No Evil (2020), which won the Golden Bear at the 70th Berlin International Film Festival. Servati later gained recognition and popularity through her roles in Once Upon a Time in Iran (2021–2022) and The Translator (2023).

Early life and career

Early life 
Mahtab Servati was born on January 22, 1992, in Tehran, Iran.

She initially studied photography but later quit it due to her "lack of interest". Her photography activities were mostly in the field of theater and behind the scenes photography. She worked as photographer in Rouhollah television series, My Gloomy Butterflies in a Wonderful Spring Morning theater, and The Last Whisper television film (all in 2013).

She gained an interest in acting after seeing actress Annali Shakouri's performance in Sajjad Afsharian's 2013 play My Gloomy Butterflies in a Wonderful Spring Morning.

After seeing the play, Servati attended Sajjad Afsharian's workshops for a year and then went on stage performing in 2014 for the first time.

2014–2019: Career beginnings 
Servati made her acting debut in Sajjad Afsharian's play Iran Vs Australia from 3 August to 6 September 2014 (she was also credited as co-writer in this play).

She later acted in Hossein Heydaripour's play What is Adel Ferdowsipour doing! from 26 April to 22 May 2015. The play consist of three parts, each part about one of the three members of the family. This time Servati had a lead role, performing the role of the daughter which now she's married and wishes to be a footballer.

Servati worked as co-photographer in The Direct-to-video The Gift (2015) directed by Amir Ahmad Ansari.

She made her screen debut in the 2015 IRIB TV2 war drama series Kimia in which she played Kimia's (Mehraveh Sharifinia) best friend, Salma, a pregnant southern woman in the midst of the Iran-Iraq war. Servati studied for the role of Salma by practicing her character's Khuzestani dialect. The series is the second longest-running Iranian television series after The Dots (2003).

Although it received mixed reviews from critics, the series was a commercial hit and became one of the highest-rated dramas in Iranian television history. Kimia receiving four Hafez Awards nominations including Best Television Series and Best Screenplay, winning the latter. She recalls her first on camera experience as "bad" due to her lack of knowledge of acting infront of camera.

Servati made her film debut in Majid Tavakoli's Born in 1987 which premiered at the 34th Fajr Film Festival in February 2016.

She worked as the main photographer in the 2016 play Khodabas.

She acted in Alireza Ajali's play A Few Slips on the Edge of the Heads of a Twisted Position from 30 October to 11 November 2016.

Servati starred as a patient in the medical television series Nurses (2016) directed by Alireza Afkhami. The series earned three nominations including Best Television Series at the S like Series Awards.

From 8 June to 24 July 2017, she acted in Hassan Madjuni's play Incident with a Metranpazh.

Servati starred in the drama series In Search of Peace (2017) directed by Saeed Soltani as Sara Sari. The series received a nomination for Best Screenplay at the 18th Hafez Awards.

In 2017, She starred alongside Rana Azadivar and Amir Aghaei in the mystery drama film Privacy, as Dorsa, a teenage girl whom her ex-boyfriend is constantly harassing and threatening her.

Servati later went on stage performing Hassan Madjuni's play Incident with a Metranpazh again from 2 to 18 May 2018, this time on a different stage.

In 2018, Servati starred in two films, Pastarioni and Anonymity.

In the rom-com film Pastarioni, she acted alongside Gohar Kheirandish as Fereshteh Torabi, a new chef who falls in love with her boss.

In the crime drama film Anonymity, she starred alongside Baran Kosari and Hassan Madjuni. Both films received mixed reviews.

In 2019, she starred in her first short film Don't Forget Today as the female lead, which she and her husband Reza (Pedram Sharifi) are going to a hospital for a checkup before abortion.

Servati had her first lead role in a feature film in Behzad Khodsveysi's Daughters of Winter (2019), starring as Niloufar, a working class girl. The film deals with the Organ donation matter. 

She later acted in two more short films, Shadow of Purple and A-orta (both in 2019).

Servati starred in the comedy film Hedgehog directed by Mastaneh Mohajer which features an ensemble cast. The filming started in October 2019 but it later was delayed due to the COVID-19 pendemic. The filming wrapped up in July 17, 2020. The film has not been released to the public yet.

She acted in Navid Memar's play Powdered Milk from December 30, 2019 to January 25, 2020.

2020: Breakthrough 
In February 2020, Servati acted in Ramin Akbari's monologue theater Stipulation Number Two after 6 months of practice for only 2 shows. She describes the shows as her most "satisfying" acting experience ever.

Servati explains her character as "A woman who constantly sees another woman in her house, and the chair that is in front of her all the time in the performance, is a souvenir of someone, and this woman's house is so small that she would hit the door and the wall while walking. From somewhere, this woman had a delusion that the chair was swelling and taking up the space of her home".

Servati starred as Nana in Mohammad Rasoulof's There Is No Evil (2020) which had its premiere at the 70th Berlin International Film Festival. The film received universal acclaim and won the Golden Bear. Servati's character Nana which appears in the third episode of the film, is a country girl who had a bond with the teacher of their village who got executed due to his different belifs.

In April 2020, she starred in the war drama television series Soldier directed by Hadi Moghadamdoost, as Mina Moafi, after three years, returning to the small screen.

Servati starred in drama film Parva directed by Mehran Mahdavian which took part at the 11th Lleida International Film Festival's Cinema Del Mon section from 29 October to 8 November 2020 in Spain.

2021–2022: Wide recognition 
In 2021, Servati acted in one web series and two feature and three short films.

In the drama film At the End of the Day directed by Babak Bahram Beigi, she starred along side Hanieh Tavassoli and Shabnam Moghaddami. The filming started in June 2021 and ended in the following month. The film has not been released to the public yet.

In the drama feature film Kulbarf directed by Milad Mansouri, she starred as a kurdish girl and had to learn kurdish dialect for her role as Chenur, a Kolbar girl.

The first short film Survivor of the Day was produced by Rasul Sadr Ameli and directed by his son, Mohammadreza Sadr Ameli.

In the second short film, Garden directed by Mostafa Soleimani which premiered at the 38th Tehran International Short Film Festival, Servati stars as a fugitive girl who asks an old man (Esmail Mehrabi) for help.

In the third short film Sweet Taste of Darkness, Servati stars as a sad and depressed young mother whose seven-year-old son identifies with the character of Batman and encourages his friends to perform risky actions. For this performance, Servati earned her first nomination for Best Actrees at the FFTG Awards in 2021.

She starred in the romance historical drama series Once Upon a Time in Iran directed by Tina Pakravan. Servati gained wide recognition and popularity for her role as Marie, an Iranian-German painter whose German mother has been exiled to Siberia by the Soviet forces following the Anglo-Soviet invasion of Iran of 1941 during World War II. The series met with critical acclaim and was widely praised for its performances.

In 2022, Servati starred in the short film Ashes directed by Saeedeh Dalirian which premiered at the 26th Canberra Short Film Festival.

Servati starred as Fereshteh, an aspiring actress in the 2022 mystery drama film The Town alongside Saed Soheili, directed by Ali Hazrati. The film had its premiere at the 40th Fajr Film Festival and earned 3 nominations.

Although the film received mixed reviews, critics praised Servati's performance. Filimo's Kamal Pourkaveh called Servati's performance "worthy of attention" and listed her performance as the top 3 things of the film.

2023: First leading role 
In 2023, she got her first leading role in a series starring in the crime mystery web series The Translator as Ghazaleh, a young translator who is seeking the truth about her brother's mysterious death.

The series was directed by Bahram Tavakoli who previously worked as the screenwriter for the critically acclaimed series Blue Whale (2019).

Servati starred in the sport film Hook (2023) directed by Hossein Rigi which had its premiere at the 41st Fajr International Film Festival. She had to learn the Balochi dialect due to her character's origin.

Personal Life 
Servati lives with her parents and has a brother named Amir and a sister named Negin.

She has stated Yalda Night as her favorite holiday.

Filmography

Film

Web

Television

Photography

Theatre

Influences 
Servati has cited Mohammad Rasoulof's The White Meadows (2009), Rasoul Mollagholipour's M for Mother (2006), Kim Ki-duk's Spring, Summer, Fall, Winter... and Spring (2003) and 3-Iron (2004), and Kamal Tabrizi's A Piece of Bread (2004) as the films that genuinely moved her.

She has cited Abdoldreza Kahani, Dariush Mehrjui and Khosrow Shakibai as the artists whom she likes to work with and love the cinematic atmosphere of their works, mentioning Needlessly and Causelessly (2012) as her favorite film of Kahani.

She has cited Anna Karenina as her favourite fictional character to play.

She has stated that her favourite music genres are Jazz, Persian hip hop and Classic, mentioning Mohammadreza Shajarian as one of her favourite classic singers.

She has cited Divaneye Man by Fereydoun Foroughi as her favorite song of all time.

Awards and nominations

References

External links 
Mahtab Servati at IMDb

1992 births
Living people
Iranian film actresses
People from Tehran
Iranian actresses